Adib Ishaq (21 January 1856 – 12 June 1885) was an important Syrian literary figure of nineteenth-century Arab Nahda.

Born in Damascus (then a city of the Ottoman Empire, and the present-day capital of Syria), he was enrolled at a Lazarists' school, where he studied Arabic and French. He left school before he was even twelve years old to meet his family's needs by working at the customs house. This experience would make him proficient in Turkish as well. At the age of fifteen, Ishaq joined his father in Beirut to work for the postal office. He later found work in the Beirut customs house, but his passion for writing pushed him towards journalism; he contributed to Al-Taqaddum (Progress). He moved to Egypt in 1876. He became a disciple of Jamal al-Din al-Afghani after meeting him in Cairo.

In 1879, he founded the Parisian journal Misr al-Qahira (Egypt the Victorious) with the help of Abdallah Marrash.

He died at his summer estate in al-Hadath (in present-day Lebanon). A collection of his works in Arabic was published under the title Al-Durar (The Pearls) by Jirjis Mikha'il Nahhas in Alexandria in 1886; another edition of Al-Durar, edited by Adib's brother Awni, was published in Beirut in 1909.

References

Sources

External links

19th-century Syrian writers
1856 births
1884 deaths
Syrian magazine founders
Writers from Damascus